"The Final Cut" is a comic book story based on the Buffy the Vampire Slayer television series.

Story description

A student movie is being filmed in Sunnydale, and the Scooby Gang hopes to get involved in the film's making. Unfortunately, this is exactly what the filmmaker intends, for the entity living inside the fictional reality of the film demands sacrifices.

Continuity

Supposed to be set in Buffy season 3.

Canonical issues

Buffy comics such as this one are not usually considered by fans as canonical. Some fans consider them stories from the imaginations of authors and artists, while other fans consider them as taking place in an alternative fictional reality. However unlike fan fiction, overviews summarising their story, written early in the writing process, were 'approved' by both Fox and Joss Whedon (or his office), and the books were therefore later published as officially Buffy merchandise.

Re-release
The only comic as part of Dark Horse's first volume of Buffy the Vampire Slayer that is uncollected in a trade paperback. Instead it was released in an expanded hardback version as part of the Supernatural Defense Kit. It is also collected in volume 3 of the Buffy the Vampire Slayer Omnibus.